Six Months, No Sun is the fourth studio album by Kieran Kane. It's the second album on Dead Reckoning Records, which is the label he established in 1994 with musicians Kevin Welch, Mike Henderson, Tammy Rogers, and Harry Stinson.  He wrote all the songs in the album apart from two songs, which are his covers of "I Wonder Where You Are Tonight" and "What a Wonderful World".

Track listing

Musicians
Kieran Kane: Vocals, Acoustic Guitar, Backing Vocals, 12-string Guitar
Andy White: Acoustic Guitar on track 10
Alison Prestwood: Backing Vocals on tracks 4, Bass on tracks 1, 4, 13
Robert Bailey: Backing Vocals on track 5
Jimmy Hall: Backing Vocals on track 5
Tammy Rogers: backing Vocals on track 1; Mandolin on tracks 3, 5, 10; Viola on track 12; Vocals on tracks 2, 9, 10
Glenn Worf: Bass on tracks 2, 3, 5, 6, 8, 9, 11, 12
Rick Cowling: Bass on track 10; Keyboards on track 10
Liam Omaonlai: Bodhrán on track 10
Harry Stinson: Drums on tracks 2, 3, 5 to 7, 11, 12; Vocals on tracks 3, 6, 8, 11
Mike Henderson: Electric Guitar on tracks 2, 3, 6, 7, 11, 12; National Guitar on track 9; Harmonica on tracks 5, 12; Mandolin on track 9; Vocals on tracks 9
Tammy Rogers: Fiddle on tracks 1, 2, 6 to 9, 11 to 13
John Jarvis: B3 Organ on tracks 2, 5, 6, 12; Piano on tracks 3, 6, 7, 10
Andy White: Vocals on track 10

Production
Kieran Kane: Producer
Harry Stinson: Producer on tracks 2, 3, 5 to 9, 11, 12
Andy White: Producer on track 4
Kieran Kane: Engineer on tracks 1, 4, 13
Peter Coleman: Engineer on tracks 2, 3, 5 to 9, 11, 12
Rick Cowling: Engineer on track 10
Dan Leffler: Assistant Engineer on tracks 2, 3, 5 to 9, 11, 12
Track information and credits taken from the album's liner notes.

References

External links
Dead Reckoning Records Official Site

1998 albums
Dead Reckoning Records albums
Kieran Kane albums